Alexey Vasilyevich Klimov (born 27 August 1975 in Tomsk) is a Russian sport shooter. He set a world record at the 2006 World Cup in the 25 metre rapid fire pistol, the event in which he specializes.

He has competed at two Olympics, finishing 8th in 2008, and 4th in 2012.

References

External links 
 
 

Living people
Russian male sport shooters
ISSF pistol shooters
Shooters at the 2008 Summer Olympics
Shooters at the 2012 Summer Olympics
Shooters at the 2016 Summer Olympics
Olympic shooters of Russia
1975 births
Shooters at the 2015 European Games
European Games silver medalists for Russia
European Games medalists in shooting